N-ethylmaleimide-sensitive factor, also known as NSF or N-ethylmaleimide sensitive fusion proteins, is an enzyme which in humans is encoded by the NSF gene.

Function 

NSF is a homohexameric AAA ATPase involved in membrane fusion. NSF is ubiquitously found in the membrane of eukaryotic cells. It is a central component of the cellular machinery in the transfer of membrane vesicles from one membrane compartment to another. During this process, SNARE proteins on two joining membranes (usually a vesicle and a target membrane such as the plasma membrane) form a complex, with the α-helical domains of the SNAREs coiling around each other and forming a very stable four-helix bundle. As SNAREs intertwine, they pull the vesicle towards the target membrane, excluding water and promoting fusion of the vesicle with the target membrane. NSF unravels SNARE complexes once membrane fusion has occurred, using the hydrolysis of ATP as an energy source, allowing the dissociated SNAREs to be recycled for reuse in further rounds of membrane fusion.  This proposal remains controversial, however.  Recent work indicates that the ATPase function of NSF does not function in recycling of vesicles but rather functions in the act of fusing vesicles with the plasma membrane.

SNARE hypothesis 

Because neuronal function depends on the release of neurotransmitters at a synapse — a process in which synaptic vesicles fuse with the presynaptic membrane — NSF is a key synaptic component. Thus, conditional temperature-sensitive mutations in the Drosophila melanogaster gene for NSF lead to a comatose behaviour at the restrictive temperature (and hence the gene is called comatose), presumably because neuronal functions are blocked. In Dictyostelium discoideum amoebae, similar mutations lead to a cessation of cell movement at the restrictive temperature, indicating a role for intracellular membrane transport in migration. Another neuronal role for NSF is indicated by its direct binding to the GluR2 subunit of AMPA type glutamate receptors (which detect the neurotransmitter glutamate). This gives NSF a putative role in delivery and expression of AMPA receptors at the synapse.

NSF was discovered by James Rothman and colleagues in 1987 while at Stanford University; they identified NSF after observing that a cytoplasmic factor, required for membrane fusions, was inactivated by treatment with N-ethylmaleimide. This assay enabled them to purify NSF.

Interactions 

N-ethylmaleimide sensitive fusion protein has been shown to interact with NAPA.

References

Further reading 

 
 
 
 
 
 
 
 
 
 
 
 
 
 
 
 
 
 
 
 

Proteins
Human proteins